Mount Confederation is a mountain located north of Gong Lake in the Athabasca River Valley of Jasper National Park, Canada. The mountain was named in 1927 by Alfred J. Ostheimer after the Fathers of Confederation.

References

Two-thousanders of Alberta
Winston Churchill Range